Paenibacillus durus is a bacterial species belonging to the Bacillota.

References

Paenibacillaceae
Bacteria described in 1974